Jung Sung-il (October 21, 1969) is a South Korean retired competitive figure skater. He is the 1991 Winter Universiade silver medalist. He placed as high as sixth at the World Junior Championships (1988) and 14th at the World Championships (1991). A three-time Olympian, he placed 22nd at the 1988 Winter Olympics, 21st at the 1992 Winter Olympics, and 17th at the 1994 Winter Olympics.

Following his retirement from competitive skating in 1996, Jung became a coach. His former students include Choi Young-eun and Lee Dong-whun.

From 2003 to 2010, Jung toured with Disney on Ice's "100 Years of Magic" show. In 2010, he returned to South Korea to work as a coach.

Competitive highlights

References

External links

 Skatabase: 1980s Olympics Mens Results
 Skatabase: 1990s Olympics Mens Results

South Korean male single skaters
Olympic figure skaters of South Korea
Figure skaters at the 1988 Winter Olympics
Figure skaters at the 1992 Winter Olympics
Figure skaters at the 1994 Winter Olympics
Figure skating coaches
1969 births
Living people
Figure skaters at the 1986 Asian Winter Games
Universiade medalists in figure skating
Korea National Sport University alumni
Universiade silver medalists for South Korea
Competitors at the 1991 Winter Universiade